Perhaps Love  is a 2005 Hong Kong musical film directed by Peter Chan, written by Lam Oi-wah and Raymond To, and choreographed by Farah Khan. It was funded by Astro Shaw and TVB, and was distributed by Celestial Pictures.

The film was submitted by Hong Kong as its official entry for the 2006 Academy Awards. It closed the Venice Film Festival in 2005.

Plot
A Chinese director Nie Wen decides to make a musical film starring his Chinese girlfriend Sun Na and Hong Kong actor Lin Jian-dong. Unknown to him, Sun has met Lin before ten years ago when she was a cabaret singer in Beijing. The two had a relationship together then, when Lin was a film student. Ten years later, now a huge movie star, Sun refuses to acknowledge they have met before.

Nie plans his musical, which includes a plot where a girl loses her memory and comes to live with a circus troupe. Sun plays the amnesiac girl and Lin her former boyfriend who tries to revive her memories. As the shooting of the film starts, reel life and real life overlap. Lin tries desperately to win back Sun's lost love, while Nie discovers their past romance. Nie himself plays the role of the obsessive circus owner in the musical, who is involved in a love triangle. Just like in real life, he has Lin as his rival.

Cast 
 Zhou Xun as Sun Na 
 Takeshi Kaneshiro as Lin Jiandong 
 Jacky Cheung as Nie Wen 
 Ji Jin-hee as Monty – A fantasy character who has a number of different roles in the film including a noodle shop owner and a reporter.
 Sandra Ng as Lin's manager
 Eric Tsang as Producer

Production
Perhaps Love was filmed in Beijing and Shanghai.  The film is the first musical to be produced in China in over forty years.

Estimates put the cost of the film at about US$10 million to produce. The film earned US$2.2 million on its opening weekend.

Soundtrack
The soundtrack was released in two versions: a single-disc version in a jewel case and a limited-edition, double-disc, boxed set version.  The double-disc version was marketed as a "Special Deluxe Edition" and included a bright red slipcase (embossed to look like leather) with gold lettering. The slipcase was seven and three-fourths inches tall, one and three-fourths inches deep, and five and three-fourths inches wide. It included a twenty-eight-page hardcover book, printed on thick paper, which included a synopsis of the film and brief biographies of its stars in both Mandarin and English. The book also included eighteen color photographs. The soundtrack was presented in a folding case with the music on a compact disc and a "making of" movie on a DVD disc.  The folding case also included five postcards (including one for each of the film's four major stars) and a poster.

Critical reception 
The film is often compared to Moulin Rouge!, as it prominently features the device of a story within a story, which depicts a real-life love triangle between the actors themselves. Unlike Moulin Rouge! however, the musical numbers are limited to the inner show.

In an interview with the Malaysian newspaper The Star, director Peter Chan stressed that "Perhaps Love is a love story, not a musical. It's not even being promoted as a musical. It's not a musical in the conventional sense. My characters don't break out into song. Initially, it was a challenge to balance the over-the-top element in musicals and the subtleties of a movie. In the end, the method I used to overcome that was to make a movie-within-a-movie."  The interview appeared in the 25 November 2005 edition of The Star, as Peter Chan was in Kuala Lumpur to promote his film.

The film has also drawn comparisons to Bollywood, the Indian film industry famous for its musical films.  The Hollywood Reporter described Perhaps Love as "Bollywood meets Bob Fosse."  Bollywood director and choreographer Farah Khan choreographed the film, which featured nine Indian dancers who appeared in several musical numbers.  The double-disc Region 3 editions of the film also contained a feature on the film's Bollywood dancers on the second disc.

Home video 
The DVD of the film was released in four different Region 3 DVD editions, including three versions released in Hong Kong and China: a single-disc edition, a double-disc "Special Edition", and a double-disc "Golden Limited Edition."  A single-disc edition was also released in Korea and had Korean subtitles.

The "Special Edition" included a gold-colored cardboard slipcase and a digipak with two DVDs. The first disc, in DVD-9 format, contained the film with optional subtitles in English, traditional Chinese, or simplified Chinese. The second disc, in DVD-5 format, contained sixty minutes of bonus material, including a "making of" feature, a b-roll, additional information on the cast, an extended credit list, and a feature on the film's Bollywood dancers, as well as other clips.

The "Golden Limited Edition" was limited to only 4,000 copies and was essentially the same as the "Special Edition", except that it also included a hardcover book of nearly two dozen pages with a gold-coloured cover.

The film was also released on VCD in a three-disc set.

Unauthorized DVDs of the film appeared within days of the film being released in theatres, and were available for purchase for US$2-US$3.

Awards and nominations 
Zhou Xun won the 12th Hong Kong Film Critics Society Award in the Best Actress category and the film was named as the Recommended Film.

The film was also nominated for eleven 25th Hong Kong Film Awards.  It won six awards: for Best Actress (Zhou Xun), Best Art Direction (Chung Man Yee and Pater Wong), Best Cinematography (Peter Pau and Christopher Doyle), Best Costume & Make Up Design (Chung Man Yee and Dora Ng), Best Original Film Score (Peter Kam and Leon Ko), and Best Original Film Song, "Perhaps Love" (this award was shared between composer Peter Kam, lyricist Him Yiu, and Jacky Cheung, who performed the song in the film).

The film won four awards at the 43rd Golden Horse Awards, which are: Best Actress (for Zhou Xun), Best Director (for Peter Chan), Best Cinematography (for Peter Pau) and Best Original Film Song (for Leon Ko)

Though Christopher Doyle worked on the cinematography for the film along with Oscar-winner Peter Pau, it's unclear whether he actually shared the Hong Kong Film Award with Peter Pau or not.

25th Hong Kong Film Awards
 Won: Best Actress (Zhou Xun)
 Won: Best Art Direction (Chung Man Yee, Pater Wong)
 Won: Best Cinematography (Peter Pau)
 Won: Best Costume & Makeup Design (Chung Man Yee, Dora Ng)
 Won: Best Original Film Score (Peter Kam, Leon Ko)
 Won: Best Original Film Song (Peter Kam, Jacky Cheung)
 Nominated: Best Picture
 Nominated: Best Director (Peter Chan)
 Nominated: Best Film Editing (Wenders Li, Chi-Leung Kwong)
 Nominated: Best Screenplay (Oi Wah Lam, Raymond To)
 Nominated: Best Sound Design (Kinson Tsang)

43rd Golden Horse Awards
 Won: Best Actress (Zhou Xun)
 Won: Best Cinematography (Peter Pau)
 Won: Best Director (Peter Chan)' Won: Best Original Film Song (Leon Ko-song:Crossroad'')
 Nominated: Best Film
 Nominated: Best Action Choreography (Wei Tung, Farah Khan)
 Nominated: Best Art Direction (Chung Man Yee, Pater Wong)
 Nominated: Best Film Editing (Wenders Li, Chi-Leung Kwong)
 Nominated: Best Makeup & Costume Design (Chung Man Yee)
 Nominated: Best Original Film Score (Peter Kam, Leon Ko)
 Nominated: Best Sound Effects (Kinson Tsang)
 Nominated: Best Visual Effects (Siu Lun Ho, Pornpol Sakarin)

References

External links
 
 Article in The Star
 Review

2000s musical films
2005 films
Chinese romantic drama films
Chinese musical films
2000s Cantonese-language films
Hong Kong musical films
Films directed by Peter Chan
Films set in Beijing
Films set in the 1990s
Films set in Shanghai
2000s Mandarin-language films
Films whose director won the Best Director Golden Horse Award